Marly-sous-Issy (literally Marly under Issy) is a commune in the Saône-et-Loire department in the region of Bourgogne-Franche-Comté in eastern France. The art historian Étienne Michon (1865–1939) was born in Marly-sous-Issy.

See also
Communes of the Saône-et-Loire department

References

Communes of Saône-et-Loire